The English Martyrs Catholic School and Sixth Form College is a secondary school and sixth form college located in Hartlepool, County Durham with academy status. English Martyrs (referred to locally as "EMS" and "Martyrs") is the only Catholic secondary school in Hartlepool. The school and college are both located on the same site on Catcote Road, however, a newly built specialist sixth form block provides the majority of A-Level classes, as well as some 11–16 school lessons.

History
St Joseph's Convent School was founded in 1885, and became a direct grant grammar school following the Education Act of 1944.
St Francis RC Grammar School was opened in 1956, and two new secondary schools, St Bede's for boys and St Anne's for girls, were opened in 1963.

St Peter's secondary modern school opened in King Oswy Drive in 1960 replacing St Bega's school. The school had approximately 200 students and the headmasters were Timothy McCarthy, followed by Robert Garraghan.

In 1973, the national policy of Comprehensive education led to all the Catholic secondary schools in the town being merged as the English Martyrs' Comprehensive School. These were St Anne's, St Bede's, St Francis', St Joseph's and St Peter's schools, each of which is represented by a star on the school badge. The new site was the buildings of St Bede's and St Anne's and the St Francis site which was closed down in 1985.

List of previous headmasters
Previous headmasters include:
 Canon John "Dickie" Bell (1973-1980)  Bell was the first headmaster of English Martyrs, having previously been headmaster of the subsumed St Francis Grammar School. Prior to that, Father Bell had been Latin teacher at St Francis. After his retirement as headmaster, Canon Bell became parish priest of St Joseph's RC parish church, Hartlepool, until his death, aged 74, in 1991.
 David Relton (1980-1995)
 Joseph Hughes (1995-2010)  Hughes joined English Martyrs as headteacher in 1995 after working in schools in Oldham, Stoke-on-Trent, Norwich and Gateshead. During his time at the helm the school went through a string of highs with rising results, strong Ofsted reports and successes in art, sport and theatre. In September 2010 he left English Martyrs to start a new role with the Diocese of Hexham and Newcastle, overseeing more than 160 Catholic schools.
 Michael Lee BA (Hons) (2010–2015)  Lee began his career at English Martyrs teaching history in 1977. His first classroom was on the Normanhurst site, a building which is now the White House Pub. Before being appointed head in September 2010, he had been head of sixth form and deputy headteacher.
 Stephen Hammond (2015–2021)
 Sara Crawshaw (2021-present)

Statistics
The following statistics are summarised from the following Evening Gazette, Northern Echo  and BBC News articles. National averages are given in (italics) after the school's score.

Gazette ratings

Ofsted ratings

Aims of the school

Intake

Main school
 Admissions Criteria 2013

The majority of secondary school students come from 6 feeder primary schools:

Sixth form
6th Form College Prospectus 2013-2014
Pupils who obtain 5 grade Cs or better at GCSE  can choose any Level 3 course i.e. an A Level or an Applied A Level course
Pupils who obtain 4 grade Cs or above at GCSE  are advised to follow a double award Applied A Level course, plus additional AS subject/s
Pupils who obtain fewer than 4 grade Cs at GCSE  are advised to follow a Level 2 course – either the BTEC First Diploma in Business or in Health and Social Care

Houses
There are five houses within the school: St John Boste, St Margaret Clitherow, Blessed John Ingram, St Anne Line and St Thomas More. In the same way as the earlier St Francis RC Grammar School had named its houses after the English Martyrs, in 2009 the houses of the English Martyrs School were introduced and named after the following. Prior to this introduction, Saints John Boste, Margaret Clitherow, Anne Line and Thomas More all existed as houses in the school's PE department for use during sports days and athletics tournaments, however they were unconnected to the pastoral or academic care of pupils.

St John Boste
Saint John Boste who was hanged, drawn and quartered in 1594.
House colour:

St Margaret Clitherow
Saint Margaret Clitherow who was crushed to death by rocks in York in 1586 for harbouring priests.
House colour:

Blessed John Ingram
The Blessed John Ingram who was executed in Newcastle-on-Tyne in 1594 as a priest ordained abroad, an act of high treason.
House colour:

St Anne Line
Saint Anne Line who was hanged at Tyburn in 1601 for harbouring a priest.
House colour:

St Thomas More
The Right Honourable Sir Thomas More, Lord Chancellor to Henry VIII of England, who was executed in 1535 and canonized in 1935 for refusing to accept the king as Supreme Head of the Church of England or his marriage to Anne Boleyn.
House colour:

Annual school events

Annual awards evening principal guests 1981-2012
A tradition of the school since 1981 where awards are given to students of both the school and sixth form college. Recognition is given to achievement at GCSE, 'A' level and GNVQ levels."
There are prizes donated by local individuals and groups as well as Huntsman Tioxide, Teesside University and The Daily Telegraph.
Each year attracts over 1000 guests and a Principal Guest of Honour "who themselves represent achievement in a range of fields". The evening also features music by the school orchestra and individual student musicians with refreshments to end the night.

Annual school show
Another tradition of the school is an annual school musical, usually held around the end of November. This features pupils from all years, although older students and sixth formers generally get the leading roles. The music department, orchestra and drama department work together on its production. Tickets are made available to parents throughout the school to buy.

Annual John Bell Lecture
This now traditional once a year lecture is usually given around March in the school's St Anne's hall. The lecture is in honour of Canon John Bell, the last headmaster of St Francis and the first headmaster of the new English Martyrs school, and lasts around 40 minutes followed by audience questions. Complimentary tickets to attend are made available free of charge.

Principal guests, school shows and John Bell Lecturers

Notable alumni

Paul Arnison, Professional footballer with over 350 professional appearances
Pete Donaldson, Radio presenter and podcast host
Kieran Bew, TV, film, stage and voice actor
Matthew Dolan, Professional footballer whose former clubs include Middlesbrough, Hartlepool United and Bradford City
 Janick Gers, Guitarist in Iron Maiden who opened the school's new music block in 2007
 Chris Gorman OBE, Entrepreneur, founder of MusicQubed
 Michael Gough, Retired cricketer and cricket umpire (umpire of the year 2011, 2012, 2013, 2014 and 2015)
 Peter Hartley, professional footballer and former Hartlepool United captain
 Michael Hunter, British, European and Commonwealth Bantamweight Boxing Champion
 Andy Linighan, Professional footballer and scorer of the winning goal in the 1993 FA Cup Final who attended along with his brothers who were also footballers, Brian Linighan and David Linighan.
 Jemma Lowe, Olympic swimmer
Savannah Marshall, Olympic boxer and boxing world champion
 Philip Middlemiss, Actor notable for playing Des Barnes in Coronation Street
 Professor Gerard Parkin FRSC, Professor of Chemistry, Columbia University
Kevin Walsh, Paralympic swimming bronze medallist

References

External links
 Official School Website

Secondary schools in the Borough of Hartlepool
Educational institutions established in 1973
Catholic secondary schools in the Diocese of Hexham and Newcastle
1973 establishments in England
Fair trade schools
Academies in the Borough of Hartlepool